Apollo Amsterdam is a professional basketball team based in Amsterdam. The club plays its games in the BNXT League, the Dutch top league. The club was founded in 2011 and has been playing in the highest national level for  years. The amateur section of the club is known as BC Apollo. Apollo Amsterdam is known for their focus on developing the Dutch basketball players and giving them growth perspective in a foreign player dominated league. Apollo debuted 25 Dutch players in the last 5,5 seasons.

History
The club was founded in 2011, as a result of a merger between BV Lely and Mosquitos, both clubs from Amsterdam. Its name is derived from its home venue the Apollohal. Apollo took over the license of the old ABC Amsterdam second team. In the first season of the club, Apollo played as an amateur team in the Promotiedivisie. They immediately won the Dutch amateur championship after defeating CBV Binnenland in the league final. 

In 2012, Apollo club decided to enter the professional Dutch Basketball League (DBL) for the 2012–13 season. In its first season, led by coach Tyrone Marioneaux and All-Star Aron Royé, Apollo finished in ninth place in the DBL.

In 2013–14, Apollo managed to reach the playoffs for the first time in franchise history. The club lost in the quarterfinals to GasTerra Flames, 0–2.

During Apollo's most successful season since their establishment, the club had financial problems which made it close to withdrawing from the DBL. However, in August 2014 it was announced Apollo would continue playing in the DBL.

In the 2015–16 season, Apollo made its second appearance in the DBL playoffs where it lost to Den Bosch 0–2 in the quarterfinals.

Apollo won its first playoff game in 2016, defeating ZZ Leiden in Game 1 of the quarterfinals. However, in a packed Apollohal, Leiden retrieved home advantage and went on to beat Apollo 1–2 and advance to the semifinals.

On 1 May 2020, Apollo announced it will not play in the 2020–21 DBL season because of uncertainty caused by the COVID-19 pandemic. Apollo also announced Laki Lakner was replacing Patrick Faijdherbe as head coach. Lakner resigned after three games, and Edwin van der Hart took over for the remainder of the season. Apollo finished in ninth place for a second season in a row.

Since the 2021–22 season, Apollo plays in the BNXT League, in which the national leagues of Belgium and the Netherlands have been merged. In June 2021, Wierd Goedee was signed as new head coach.

Honours

Promotiedivisie
Winners (1): 2011–12

Players

Current roster

Depth chart

Individual awards
DBL All-Defense Team
Berend Weijs – 2019
DBL Rookie of the Year
Berend Weijs – 2013
DBL blocks leader
Berend Weijs – 2013, 2014, 2018, 2019
DBL All-Rookie Team
Lucas Steijn – 2014

Notable players

NCAA Division 1 players from academy
The youth academy of Apollo Amsterdam has developed the following players who have played in the NCAA Division I. Players in bold have played minutes for the senior team in the Dutch Basketball League or BNXT League.

Top scorers by seasons

Individual awards

DBL Top Scorer
Xavier Cannefax – 2020
DBL Rookie of the Year
Berend Weijs – 2013
DBL All-Rookie Team
Lucas Steijn – 2014

Season by season

List of head coaches
The following is a list of all the head coaches of Apollo since its establishment in 2011:

Notes

References

External links
Official website 
Eurobasket.com BC Apollo Amsterdam Page

Basketball teams in the Netherlands
Basketball teams established in 2011
2011 establishments in the Netherlands
Dutch Basketball League teams
Sports clubs in Amsterdam